The Simmons Ranch near Fruitland, Utah dates from 1913.  It has also been known as Remund Ranch.  It was listed on the National Register of Historic Places in 1992.  The listing included four log cabin-style contributing buildings and four other contributing structures.

The ranch is within a canyon of the Strawberry River.  It was deemed significant as the oldest surviving homestead—and unusual as a successful one—in this area of Duchesne County, Utah, out of "European/American" settlers.  Ownership for the property was filed in 1913, after the area, formerly part of the Uintah Reservation of the Ute tribe, was opened for non-Indian settlers.  Charles Simmons did not finalize the patent until 1928 however.

References 

Ranches on the National Register of Historic Places in Utah
Buildings and structures completed in 1913
Buildings and structures in Duchesne County, Utah
1913 establishments in Utah
Historic districts on the National Register of Historic Places in Utah
National Register of Historic Places in Duchesne County, Utah